Rai Haider Ali Khan is a Pakistani politician who was a Member of the Provincial Assembly of the Punjab, from May 2013 to May 2018 and from July 2018 to January 2023.

Early life and education
He was born on 23 March 1967.
 
He has a degree of Bachelor of Arts which he obtained in 1986 from Government College University, Lahore and has a degree of Bachelor of Laws which he received in 1991 from Punjab University Law College.

Political career

He was elected to the Provincial Assembly of the Punjab as a candidate of Pakistan Muslim League (Nawaz) (PML-N) from Constituency PP-54 (Faisalabad-IV) in 2013 Pakistani general election. He served as Advisor to Chief Minister of Punjab Shehbaz Sharif for Literacy and Non-Formal Basic Education before being appointed as Advisor to Chief Minister on Tourism in November 2016.

He was re-elected to Provincial Assembly of the Punjab as a candidate of PML-N from Constituency PP-101 (Faisalabad-V) in 2018 Pakistani general election.

He joined the Pakistan Tehreek-e-Insaf (PTI) on 2 February 2023.

References

Living people
Punjab MPAs 2013–2018
1967 births
Pakistan Muslim League (N) MPAs (Punjab)
Government College University, Lahore alumni
Punjab University Law College alumni
Punjab MPAs 2018–2023